Terrance Millard (15 December 192920 November 2019) was a South African horse racing trainer. He trained over 2,500 winners, including 117 Grade 1 victories, 44 Grade 2 races, and 37 Grade 3 races. He held the record for the most Grade 1 wins at 117, until that was surpassed by Mike de Kock in 2018.

He trained six winners of the Durban July Handicap, including six winners of the Metropolitan Handicap and the Gold Cup.

Biography 
Terrance Millard was born on 15 December 1929 in Cape Town to an immigrant Welsh couple. He attended school at Rondebosch Boys High School, before attending Marist Brothers.

Millard became a professional horse racing trainer in 1954, and saddled his first winner on 27 November 1954. He trained his horses at his 12.5 hectare establishment at Bloubergstrand, which hosted over 70 stables. He said the "galloping goldmine", Empress Club, was the greatest horse he ever trained. The Argentinean import won fifteen races, including nine Grade 1 races, which included the Queen's Plate and the Metropolitan Handicap (then known as the J&B Met) in 1993.

Millard and his wife Joyce had been married for 54 years when she died. He retired in 1991, at the age of 61. He died on 20 November 2019, just one month short of his 90th birthday.

Competitive history 

Millard dominated the Durban July Handicap from 1983 to 1990 training six Durban July Handicap winners. On two occasions, his horses filled the top three places. His winners include:

References 

1929 births
2019 deaths
South African horse trainers